The 2018 Korea National League Championship was the 15th competition of the Korea National League Championship.

Group stage

Group A

Group B

Knockout stage

Bracket

Semi-finals

Final

See also
2018 in South Korean football
2018 Korea National League

References

External links

Korea National League Championship seasons
K